Jason Wilson (born 31 October 1990) is a Barbadian triathlete. He competed in the men's event at the 2016 Summer Olympics.

References

External links
 

1990 births
Living people
Barbadian male triathletes
Olympic triathletes of Barbados
Triathletes at the 2016 Summer Olympics
Sportspeople from Bridgetown
Pan American Games competitors for Barbados
Triathletes at the 2015 Pan American Games
Commonwealth Games competitors for Barbados
Triathletes at the 2014 Commonwealth Games
Triathletes at the 2018 Commonwealth Games